"Red White and Blue" is a song by American Southern rock band Lynyrd Skynyrd, released on their 2003 album Vicious Cycle. It reached number 27 on the Billboard Mainstream Rock chart. It was written shortly after the September 11 attacks.

Chart performance

References

American patriotic songs
2003 songs
Lynyrd Skynyrd songs
Sanctuary Records singles